Stothert & Pitt was a British engineering company founded in 1855 in Bath, England. It was the builder of various engineering products ranging from Dock cranes to construction plant and household cast iron items. It went out of business in 1989. The name and intellectual property became part of Clarke Chapman.

History 
George Stothert (n.b. early on the name is sometimes rendered as Stoddard or Stodhert) moved to Bath in 1785 having taken over Thomas Harris's ironmonger's business. He was an agent for Abraham Darby I's Coalbrookdale Iron Company, selling all types of domestic ironmongery. By 1815 they set up their own foundry as Abraham Darby had opened his own warehouse in Bristol. The company was now managed by his son, also George. In 1851 they exhibited a hand crane at the Great Exhibition.

In 1837, Henry Stothert, brother of the younger George, set up an ironworks in Bristol, first as Henry Stothert & Co., then, joined by Edward Slaughter, Stothert, Slaughter & Co.  Slaughter had earlier formed Slaughter & Co. at his Avonside Ironworks, later and better known as Avonside.  This works produced some substantial iron engineering including a swivel bridge over the river Frome, several of the first engines for Brunel's Great Western Railway and the Bristol and Exeter Railway, as well as 14 engines for the Brighton and South Coast Railway.

Robert Pitt became an apprentice with Stothert in Bath in 1834 to 1840. In 1840-41 he was working as a draughtsman for Stothert, Slaughter & Co. in Bristol but was back in Bath from 1841 to 1842 helping with the establishment of Stothert's Newark Street Foundry. In 1844 Pitt became a partner with Stotherts along with a second partner Rayno, sometimes referred to as Stothert, Rayno & Pitt, the firm was usually, simply, called Stotherts. In 1855 it became Stothert and Pitt, in 1883 a limited company and in 1902 the firm became a limited company

In the period from the 1840s to 1900 the Bath company expanded rapidly.  Moving from earlier premises on the north side of the river Avon, to the Newark Street Works on the south-side, then, developing the Victoria Works in the 1890s which filled the valley between the river and the Lower Bristol Road.  Some early work by Stothert can still be seen on the Kennett & Avon Canal in Bath, where two very elegant iron bridges span the canal with the Stothert name on them.  However, it was in the 1840s that the firm began to develop the cranes which eventually were to make them a world name in crane building.

The earliest surviving crane which was probably made by Stothert can be found at Carmarthen and dates from about 1850, but it bears no name plate. The oldest crane bearing the Stothert & Pitt name was used in Box quarries and probably dates from the 1860s, it was designed to lift 6 tons and sits in a garden in Box. The company began to make its name in the world of large scale crane manufacture when in 1869 the made a Titan crane for setting 27-ton blocks during construction of the Manora Point breakwater, Karachi ('Kurrachee'). Tested with 40-ton load in Bath, September 1869 [9].   They then built a 35 ton Fairbairn steam crane for Bristol docks in 1876, to an improved design by William Fairbairn. The boiler maker's plate reads "Marshall Sons & Co. Ltd., Engineers, Gainsboro, England, No.92766". In 1876 they supplied a blocksetting crane to Colombo Harbour Works, Ceylon for breakwater works. Stothert and Pitt; 17/30-ton non rotative, sidesetter.

20th century 
Building rail cranes for export to the colonies.

Electric dock cranes 

Stothert and Pitt supplied their earliest electric powered crane to Southampton Dock Authority in 1892. Electric power provided several advantages: powerful motors could be placed in each crane and powered centrally, without requiring a separate prime mover (i.e. steam engine and boiler) in each crane. The crane mechanisms were also lighter, allowing them to be placed on raised carriages that could then straddle a railway freight line- the portal crane. Rather than requiring a bare strip of unused quayside between the railway line and the harbour wall to leave space for cranes, the railway could now be brought right to the dock edge. Cranes were also available immediately, without waiting for boilers to raise steam. Most importantly though (and an advantage over centrally powered hydraulic cranes), electric cranes were now mobile along the dock edge on their own rail lines. Rather than ships queueing for a single berth space alongside a fixed crane, cranes could be brought to each ship's hold hatches as needed. This made a single crane far more efficient, in terms of cargo handled per day. Soon such mobile electric cranes were near universal.

Five examples of electric cranes provided in 1951 have been preserved by Bristol Museum Service at Princes Wharf.

Level-luffing cranes 

In 1912, Stothert & Pitt's design team, led by Claude Topliss, developed an improved design of level luffing gear, which greatly improved the speed and efficiency of cargo handling cranes fitted with it. . This used an arrangement of compensating hoist cables to automatically keep the hook, and load, level as the jib was luffed up and down.

Bulk handling cranes 

As cranes became more common in docks, and as ships became bigger, they also became more specialised. In 1927, Stothert & Pitt produced the first bulk-handling crane. Rather than a simple hook that could handle a range of slung loads, this was a crane designed around the use of an integral grab. Working the grab requires extra cable or cables from the crane jib, so these are a whole specialised design. The first was to unload coal at a power station in London.

Another innovation was the kangaroo crane. Rather than slewing (rotating) the crane to reach the delivery hopper on-shore, a kangaroo crane has its own in-built hopper beneath the jib, that slews with it. Dumping the grab contents into the hopper now only requires the quicker luffing movement, without needing to slew.

World War I 
In July 1915 the company took over the construction of the Pedrail Machine, an attempt to create an armoured fighting vehicle for use on the Western Front. The machine, designed by Colonel R. E. B. Crompton, a consultant to the Landship Committee, ran on a pair of pedrail tracks in tandem. It was intended to mount an armoured body on the chassis so that a party of troops could be carried across no-man's-land. After the Landship Committee decided against the machine, the War Office transferred construction to S&P, with a view to completing it as a mobile flame-thrower. The finished chassis was handed over to the Trench Warfare Department in August, but no further development took place.

World War II 
During World War II the company built tanks and miniature submarines for the War Office, as well as armaments.

The Challenger tank was a development of the Cromwell tank chassis, so as to take the more powerful 17 Pounder gun. Stothert & Pitt built this tank and designed various modifications. Lengthening the chassis from five roadwheels to six presented no difficulty for such an engineering firm, but designing armoured fighting vehicles was new to them and their efforts were not wholly successful. The new turret for Challenger carried the gun and its higher recoil well enough, but only by being nearly twice the height of other turrets for this chassis – making the tank a much easier target. The A30 (Avenger) tank destroyer was a similar development of a 17pdr gun on the same lengthened chassis, but had an open-topped turret 2 feet lower than that of Challenger. During the development of Challenger, the prototype turret was first mounted on the even larger TOG 2.

Post-war era
By 1974 Stothert & Pitt had built 30,000 single-drum pedestrian rollers.

Current operations 
The firm was sold to Robert Maxwell's Hollis Group in 1986. Following the collapse of Maxwell's empire a management buy out was undertaken in 1988. But this failed and the company closed in 1989, resulting in all the works shutting down. The Stothert & Pitt name was sold to Langley Holdings, which now belongs to the NEI group owners of Clarke Chapman, and is operated for Dock crane consultancy. Despite ceasing all manufacturing operations, the company exists for consultancy, reference and repairs.

Stothert & Pitt moved from Bath to Bristol in summer 2008 to the Bradman Lake offices on Yelverton Road in Brislington, Bristol. Bradman Lake moved again in 2019 to Unity Road, Keynsham taking Stothert & Pitt with them.  
Stothert & Pitt still offer spares and aftermarket support for all its dockside and offshore cranes still in operation.

Former works
Stothert & Pitt's former  Newark Works, now grade II listed, was converted in 2022 into flexible working space for small businesses as part of the Bath Quays development. Its larger site was developed from 2011 into the Bath Western Riverside residential scheme.

Model range

Construction machinery 
 Pedestrian rollers
 Vibroll 28W Roller
 Concrete mixers
 "Victoria" mobile mixers
 Lorry-mounted concrete mixers
 Concrete batching plants
 "Super 64" concrete mixer – used for runway construction
 No.16 Tarmacadam plant for the war office
 Cranes
 Goliath type yard cranes
 "Titan", a 50 ton block-setting cranes built in 1899 for building breakwaters at South Shields.

Other products 
 Dock cranes
 Container loaders from the 1970 onward
 Goliath cranes for dock building
 Electric dock cranes (some still preserved Bristol docks & also 12 grade 2 listed dock cranes in Royal Victoria Dock in London's east end E16)
 DD2 Dock cranes, 5ton @ 80 ft, 5ton @ 100 ft, or 3 ton @ 65 ft versions.
 Shipyard cranes
 Hammerhead cranes for Rosyth Dockyard, 120 ton max lift or 180 ft radius built 1965.
 and HMNB Devonport in Plymouth, 1,450 tonnes of structure with a lift of 80 tonnes. Recently dismantled.

 Fire grates & household ironmongery merchants
 Offshore platform cranes (made up until closure of works)
 Pump units (now made by Albany Pumps)
 Railway breakdown cranes (Early 20th century)
 Ship cranes
 Seaplane recovery cranes, for the Admiralty
 Scissor lifts (self propelled) introduced in the 1980s
 Winches
 Lifeboat davits, such as the gantry ones used on the HMHS Britannic

See also 
 Aveling-Barford
 Joseph Day
 Clarke Chapman
 Northern Engineering Industries Ltd – (NEI)
 Albany Pumps

References 
 Stothert & Pitt - The Rise and Fall of a Bath Company (Millstream Books 2007), John Payne,

External links 

 
 
Stothert & Pitt Cricket Club

Companies based in Bath, Somerset
Engineering companies of the United Kingdom
Former defence companies of the United Kingdom
History of the tank
Military history of the United Kingdom during World War I
Military history of the United Kingdom during World War II
Crane manufacturers
British brands